Kill After Kill is the sixth studio album by the Canadian speed metal band Exciter, released in 1992. It was the last album to feature founding member, singer/drummer Dan Beehler and only album with new bassist David Ledden

Track listing 
All music by John Ricci and Dan Beehler. All lyrics by Beehler.

Personnel 
Dan Beehler – vocals, backing vocals, drums
John Ricci – guitars
David Ledden – bass

Production
Manfred Leidecker – mixing 
Neil Campbell – mixing

References

External sites
 

1992 albums
Exciter (band) albums
Noise Records albums